"Glory, Glory" (also known as "When I Lay My Burden Down", "Since I Laid My Burden Down", "Glory, Glory, Hallelujah" and other titles) is an American spiritual song, which has been recorded by many artists in a variety of genres, including folk, country, blues, rock, and gospel. It is typically very melodically similar to another popular gospel song, "Will the Circle Be Unbroken".

Lyrics
Lyrically, the song has many variations, but the best-known version of the song (as performed by Odetta or Roy Acuff) opens with:

Recordings

 The Elders McIntorsh and Edwards' Sanctified Singers – "Since I Laid My Burden Down" (recorded Chicago, December 4, 1928)
 Blind Roosevelt Graves – "When I Lay My Burdens Down" (Complete Recorded Works in Chronological Order, recorded in 1936)
 Maddox Brothers and Rose – "When I Lay My Burden Down" (recorded between 1946 and 1951 and included on the compilation The Maddox Brothers and Rose – Vol. 1)
 The Soul Stirrers – "Glory, Glory Hallelujah" (1948)
 Odetta – "Glory, Glory" (Odetta Sings Ballads and Blues, 1956)
 The Big 3 – "Glory, Glory" (Live at the Recording Studio, 1964)
 Mississippi John Hurt – "Since I've Laid This Burden Down" (The Best of Mississippi John Hurt, 1966)
 Furry Lewis – "Lay My Burden Down" (Blues Magician, recorded 1969)
 Mississippi Fred McDowell "When I Lay My Burden Down" (c. 1970)
 Roy Acuff – "When I Lay My Burden Down" (Night Train to Memphis, 1970)
 The Byrds – "Glory, Glory" (Byrdmaniax, 1971)
Ike & Tina Turner – "Glory, Glory" (The Gospel According to Ike & Tina, 1974)
 Otha Turner – "Glory, Glory Hallelujah" (From Senegal to Senatobia, 1999)
 Dr. John with Mavis Staples and The Dirty Dozen Brass Band – "Lay My Burden Down" (N'Awlinz Dis, Dat, or D'Udda, 2005)
 Larry Sparks – "Lay My Burden Down" (Transamerica, 2005)
 Glenn Kaiser – "Since I Laid My Burdens Down" (Grrrecords, 2006)
 City and Colour & The Coppertone – "When I Lay My Burden Down" ("Wood & Wires Productions", c. 2010)
 Will McFarlane – "Lay My Burden Down" (Will McFarlane, c. 2015)

References

External links
 "Glory, Glory Hallelujah" performed live by Robert Sims and Odetta 
 The Big Three Featuring Mama Cass Elliot
 [ AllMusic: review of The Byrds' version of "Glory, Glory"]
 AMG: All performers of "Glory, Glory", "Glory Glory", "Lay My Burden Down"

American folk songs
Odetta songs
The Byrds songs
Ike & Tina Turner songs
Year of song unknown
Songwriter unknown